Darko Matić (born March 18, 1984) is a Serbian retired professional basketball player.

References

External links
 Profile at realgm.com
 Profile at eurobasket.com

1984 births
Living people
Basketball players from Belgrade
KK Zemun players
KK Superfund players
KK Plana players
Point guards
Doxa Lefkadas B.C. players
Serbian men's basketball players
Serbian expatriate basketball people in Bosnia and Herzegovina
Serbian expatriate basketball people in Greece
Serbian expatriate basketball people in Romania
Serbian expatriate basketball people in North Macedonia